Emil Müller (March 5, 1920 – April 2, 2008) was a Swiss mycologist. He specialised in the study of the systematics of the ascomycetes. Müller was the editor of the scientific journal Sydowia for several years, taking over the position after the death of the previous editor and founder, Franz Petrak, in 1973. Müller published more than 200 papers in his scientific career. He was well known in the mycological community for two taxonomic publications co-authored with his colleague J.A. von Arx: Die Gattungen der amerosporen Pyrenomyceten (Genera of the amerosporous Pyrenomycetes, 1954) and Die Gattungen der didymosporen Pyrenomyceten (Genera of didymosporous Pyrenomycetes, 1962).

In 1968, botanist Lennart Holm published Muellerites, which is a genus of fungi in the class Dothideomycetes and named after Emil. Then in 1968, Muelleromyces (the family Phyllachoraceae) was published.

See also
List of mycologists

References

1920 births
2008 deaths
Swiss mycologists